Okoyo is a town and the seat of Okoyo District in the Cuvette Region in central Republic of the Congo. It is on the Alima River and is served by Okoyo Airport.

Cuvette Department
Populated places in the Republic of the Congo